is a Japanese voice actor from Chiba Prefecture. He graduated from the Tokyo Seiyu Academy and Ezaki Productions Training School (currently Mausu Promotion Actors' School). After working at Mausu Promotion, he joined Aksent.

Filmography

Anime series
Nintama Rantarou
Ceres, Celestial Legend – Tomonori Aogiri
X-Men: Evolution – Mesmero, Blob
Hikaru no Go – Tatsuhiko Kadowaki, others
Shaman King – Marco
Super GALS! Kotobuki Ran – Tsukasa Mitani, Kazuki Katase
Heat Guy J – Joe Sayama
Astro Boy - Delta
Naruto – Kaiza
E's Otherwise – Eiji Sagimiya
Fullmetal Alchemist – Cray
Uninhabited Planet Survive! – Bell
Daphne in the Brilliant Blue – Thomas
Fafner of the Azure – Haruko Kodate
Initial D Fourth Stage – Smiley Sakai
Viewtiful Joe – Hulk Davidson
Zipang – Gunichi Mikawa
Gallery Fake – Kuraun
MAJOR 2nd series – Inui
Shinshaku Sengoku Eiyū Densetsu – Sanada Jū Yūshi – Sanada Nobuyuki
Naruto Shippuden – Akaboshi
Wangan Midnight – Takayuki Kuroki
Fresh Pretty Cure – Keitarō Momozono
Beelzebub - Reiji Kiriya
Shingeki no Kyojin – Father Mikasa

Original video animation
Sonic the Hedgehog – Secretary

Anime series
Crayon Shin-chan: Honeymoon Hurricane ~The Lost Hiroshi~ – Riders
Saezuru Tori wa Habatakanai – The Clouds Gather – Kazuaki Hirata

Video games
Tenchu: Stealth Assassins – Goo
Koukidou Gensou Gunparade March – Keigo Tosaka
Max Payne – Police Officer
Romance wa Tsurugi No Kagayaki II – Albion, Phalanx, Gorba
Shaman King: Spirit of Shamans – Marco
Tokyo Majin Gakuen Gehouchou 
Shaman King: Soul Fight – Marco
Shaman King: Funbari Spirits – Marco
Advance Guardian Heroes - Sky Knight, Demon
Fu-un Bakumatsu-den – Yamagata Aritomo
Yoshitsuneki – Taira no Noritsune
Viewtiful Joe: Red Hot Rumble – Hulk Davidson
Valkyrie Profile: Lenneth – Suo
Initial D Extreme Stage - Smiley Sakai
Kowloon Youma Gakuen Ki 
Tokyo Majin Gakuen Kenpuuchou 
Infamous Second Son – Hank
Monster Hunter: World - Huntsman
Ace Combat 7: Skies Unknown - High Roller

Tokusatsu
Tokusou Sentai Dekaranger – Handorean Decho

Drama CDs
Subete wa Kono Yoru ni – Yasuyuki Takei

Radio Drama
Final Fantasy Tactics Advance – Judge, Cid's Coworker

Dubbing
The 5th Wave – Oliver Sullivan (Ron Livingston)
Divergent – Eric Coulter (Jai Courtney)
The Divergent Series: Insurgent – Eric Coulter (Jai Courtney)
Garden State – Mark (Peter Sarsgaard)
Gotham – Alfred Pennyworth (Sean Pertwee)
Guardians of the Galaxy – Watchtower Guard (Enzo Cilenti)
Hail, Caesar! – Eddie Mannix (Josh Brolin)
The Hitchhiker's Guide to the Galaxy – Ford Prefect (Mos Def)
Jack Ryan: Shadow Recruit – Viktor Cherevin (Kenneth Branagh)
Jeepers Creepers 2 – Scotty Braddock (Eric Nenninger)
Lonely Hearts – Detective Reilly (Scott Caan)
The Man from Nowhere – Man-seok (Kim Hee-won)
Rise of the Planet of the Apes – Rodney (Jamie Harris)
The Stand – Glen Bateman (Greg Kinnear)
Street Kings – Coates (Common)
Tactical Force – Demetrius (Michael Shanks)
True and the Rainbow Kingdom - Rainbow King (Eric Peterson)

References

External links
Aksent Profile

Akimitsu Takase at Ryu's Seiyuu Info

Living people
Actors from Chiba Prefecture
Japanese male voice actors
1970 births